Crenicichla mandelburgeri is a species of cichlid native to South America. It is found in the río Paraná basin.

The fish is named in honor of Paraguayan ichthyologist Darío Mandelburger, the co-coordinator of Proyecto Vertebrados del Paraguay (1992-1999).

References

Kullander, S.O., 2009. Crenicichla mandelburgeri, a new species of cichlid fish (Teleostei: Cichlidae) from the Paraná river drainage in Paraguay. Zootaxa 2006:41-50.

mandelburgeri
Taxa named by Sven O. Kullander
Fish described in 2009